Ramleh may refer to:
 Ramleh, Hormozgan
 Ramleh-ye Olya, Ramshir County, Khuzestan Province, Iran
 Ramleh-ye Sofla, Ramshir County, Khuzestan Province, Iran